This is a list of members of the Constituent Assembly of Luxembourg.  The Constituent Assembly was elected on 19 April 1848 to write a new constitution for Luxembourg.

References
  

Lists of political office-holders in Luxembourg